Ab Kanaru (also Romanized as Āb Kanārū; also known as Āb Kanārūn, Āb Kenāreh, and Khān Aḩmad-e Bālā) is a village in Babuyi Rural District, Basht District, Basht County, Kohgiluyeh and Boyer-Ahmad Province, Iran. At the 2006 census, its population was 151, in 32 families.

References 

Populated places in Basht County